Lunenburg was a federal electoral district in Nova Scotia, Canada, that was represented in the House of Commons of Canada from 1867 to 1925 and from 1949 to 1953. Its boundary was that of Lunenburg County, Nova Scotia.

History
The electoral district was created as part of the British North America Act, 1867. In 1924, it became obsolete when consolidated with Queens—Lunenburg riding. In the redistribution of 1947, the riding was re-established from Queens—Lunenburg, and then re-consolidated with the previous riding in 1952.

Members of Parliament

This riding elected the following Members of Parliament:

Election results

Lunenburg, 1867–1925

Lunenburg, 1949–1953

See also 

 List of Canadian federal electoral districts
 Past Canadian electoral districts

External links 
 Riding history for Lunenburg (1867–1924) from the Library of Parliament
 Riding history for Lunenburg (1947–1952) from the Library of Parliament

Former federal electoral districts of Nova Scotia